Robert Holton Ziegler, Sr. (March 27, 1921 – September 29, 1991) was an American lawyer and politician.

Born in Baltimore, Maryland, Ziegler served in the United States Army Medical Corps during World War II. He then received his law degree from the University of Virginia School of Law in 1948. He then moved to Ketchikan, Alaska and practiced law with his father A. H. Ziegler who served in the Alaska Territorial Legislature. From 1957 until 1959, Ziegler served in the Alaska Territorial House of Representatives and was a Democrat. Then from 1965 until 1987. Ziegler served in the Alaska State Senate. He owned the Ziegler House (Ketchikan, Alaska). Ziegler died of cancer in Ketchikan, Alaska.

References

External links
 Robert Ziegler Sr. at 100 Years of Alaska's Legislature

|-

1921 births
1991 deaths
20th-century American lawyers
Alaska lawyers
Democratic Party Alaska state senators
Deaths from cancer in Alaska
Members of the Alaska Territorial Legislature
Politicians from Baltimore
People from Ketchikan, Alaska
University of Virginia School of Law alumni
20th-century American politicians
United States Army personnel of World War II